Travelin' Light is an album by organist Shirley Scott and guitarist Kenny Burrell recorded in 1964 and released on the Prestige label.

Reception
The Allmusic site awarded the album 3 stars stating "It's Sunday morning soul-jazz, and such is the languor and even keel of most of the tunes".

Track listing 
 "Trav'lin' Light" (Johnny Mercer, Jimmy Mundy, Trummy Young) - 4:44  
 "Solar" (Miles Davis) - 6:05  
 "Nice 'n' Easy" (Marilyn Bergman, Larry Keith, Lew Spence) - 4:36  
 "Stormy Monday" (T-Bone Walker) - 11:11  
 "Baby, It's Cold Outside" (Frank Loesser) - 3:53  
 "The Kerry Dance" (James Lynam Molloy) - 3:06

Personnel 
 Shirley Scott - organ
 Kenny Burrell - guitar
 Eddie Khan - bass
 Otis Finch - drums

References 

1964 albums
Albums produced by Ozzie Cadena
Albums recorded at Van Gelder Studio
Prestige Records albums
Shirley Scott albums
Kenny Burrell albums